The Advisory Council on Underwater Archaeology (ACUA) serves as an international advisory body on issues relating to underwater archaeology, conservation, and submerged cultural resources management. It works to educate scholars, governments, sport divers, and the public about underwater archaeology and the preservation of underwater cultural heritage. The ACUA is an independent, non-profit organization closely affiliated with the Society for Historical Archaeology (SHA). The ACUA helps the SHA Conference Committee to organize the annual SHA Conference on Historical and Underwater Archaeology and provides continuing education through workshops and panel discussions.

The ACUA website, blog, and social media platforms provide a forum for discussion and information sharing related to underwater and maritime archaeology to encourage the responsible stewardship, preservation, and protection of underwater and maritime cultural heritage. In 2013 the ACUA was recognized as an NGO by UNESCO. It actively participates in the meetings of the UNESCO Scientific and Technical Advisory Body  (STAB) on the promotion of the Convention on the Protection of Underwater Cultural Heritage.

Mission 
The Advisory Council on Underwater Archaeology advocates, promotes, and provides advice on responsible public education and stewardship of underwater cultural heritage for present and future generations.

The ACUA supports the ethical principals of the Society for Historical Archaeology. The ACUA encourages all archaeologists to perform to the highest standards of integrity and professionalism. The organization's Core Principles promote an ethical culture in all activities, in the work place, in the field, and in the classroom to create a climate of trust, respect, and equality. The ACUA provides further guidance on ethical obligations and standards of behavior through its statements on anti-harassment and anti-discrimination.

Formation 
The ACUA has been at the forefront of underwater archaeology for nearly 60 years and it the oldest organization of its type. Its genesis as the Council on Underwater Archaeology was in 1959 and its purpose was fully realized at a meeting in 1963 when a group of archaeologists, historians, and sport divers met in St. Paul, Minnesota for the first international Conference on Underwater Archaeology (CUA).

The first joint conference with the then fledgling Society for Historical Archaeology was held in 1970. By 1973, the present structure and name of the ACUA were established and shortly thereafter the SHA and CUA conferences merged. In 2003, the ACUA and SHA signed a Memorandum of Agreement, formalizing their relationship.

Publications 
The ACUA maintains several publications including: 
 ACUA Underwater Archaeology Proceedings comprising papers given at the annual SHA Conference. 
 Archaeological Photo Festival Competition open to all SHA members to promote public outreach and education between underwater and terrestrial archaeology. Photos from the annual competition are used for an annual calendar provided to all SHA Conference attendees.
 The quarterly ACUA Student Newsletter, published by the ACUA Graduate Student Members, which focuses on student research and field projects related to underwater archaeology.
 An introductory brochure on underwater archaeology available for download online in English, Spanish, and Portuguese.

Training 
The ACUA offers a full-day Submerged Cultural Resources Awareness Workshop annually during the SHA Conference on Historical and Underwater Archaeology. This workshop introduces non-specialists to issues specific to underwater archaeology. Participants learn about different types of underwater cultural heritage (UCH) sites, and the techniques used in Phase I and II equivalent surveys. This workshop does not teach participants to be underwater archaeologists, but introduces different investigative techniques, international Best Practices, and existing legislation. The purpose of this workshop is to assist non-specialists in:
 recognizing the potential for UCH resources in their areas of impact,
 budgeting for UCH resource investigations,
 reviewing UCH resource assessments, 
 developing interpretive strategies,
 providing sufficient background information to assist in making informed decisions regarding UCH resources. 
The workshop is certified by the Register of Professional Archaeologists and RPA members receive continuing professional education credit.

Awards 
The ACUA awards the competitive George Fischer Student Travel Award annually to provide $1,000.00 (USD) in travel support for an international maritime archaeology student to attend and present at the annual Society for Historical and Underwater Archaeology conference. The aware is named after George Fischer, a founding and emeritus member of the ACUA. The award helps to advance board's goal to support the professional development of students embarking on their nascent careers; which furthers the overall mission of the ACUA to foster the growth and development of underwater and maritime archaeology around the globe. Since the inaugural award in 2012, students hailing from the West Indies, Argentina, United Kingdom, and Australia have benefited from the support to participate in the exchange of ideas at the annual conference.

Meetings 
The ACUA meets regularly as part of the annual SHA Conference on Historical and Underwater Archaeology.

Leadership 
The ACUA is composed of twelve individuals elected on a rotating basis for four-year terms by the membership of the Society for Historical Archaeology. The members include professionals from state and federal archaeology programs, museums, non-profit institutes, cultural resource management firms, universities, conservation laboratories, and avocational societies involved in underwater archaeology. Members hail from Europe, Canada, Australia, Mexico, South America, the Caribbean, and the United States. The board elects officers for three year terms. All board terms expire at the ACUA business meeting in January.

In addition to regularly elected members, the ACUA has Associate Members who provide their insights and expertise on technical issues, education, sport diver training, shipwreck preserves and management, and international issues. The associate members may be individuals who are invited because of their particular expertise, or institutions who are invited because of their long and outstanding contributions to the field of underwater archaeology.

Graduate Student Associates extend the council’s outreach to and input from the small but active community of students, who are the future of the field. All associate terms are two years.

See also 
 Underwater archaeology

References

External links
 ACUA official website
 ACUA Blog
 ACUA Committees
 ACUA George Fischer Student Travel Award
 ACUA Leadership
 ACUA Photo Contest Archive
 ACUA Publications
 ACUA organizational documents
 Brochure on Underwater Archaeology
 Support for Underwater Exploration and Education

Maritime archaeology
Archaeological organizations